Roberto Lippi (October 17, 1926 – October 31, 2011) was a racing driver from Italy.  He participated in 3 Formula One World Championship Grands Prix, all of them in Italy, debuting on September 10, 1961.  He started only one of these races, and scored no championship points.

Complete Formula One World Championship results
(key)

Sources
Profile at www.grandprix.com

Italian racing drivers
Italian Formula One drivers
1926 births
2011 deaths
24 Hours of Le Mans drivers
Ferrari people
World Sportscar Championship drivers